The Church of St Andrew in Rippingale, Lincolnshire, England, is a Grade I–listed Anglican church. The earliest phase of the church dates back to the mid-13th Century.

References

Church of England church buildings in Lincolnshire
13th-century church buildings in England
South Kesteven District
Grade I listed churches in Lincolnshire